El Hammamy, Elhammamy, El-Hammamy or ElHammamy is an Arabic surname. Notable people with the surname include:

 Hania El Hammamy (born 2000), Egyptian squash player
 Karim El Hammamy (born 1995), Egyptian squash player

See also
 Hammami (disambiguation)

Arabic-language surnames